Peter I of Courtenay (1126 – 10 April 1183) was the sixth son of Louis VI of France and his second wife, Adélaide de Maurienne. He was the father of the Latin Emperor Peter II of Courtenay.

Peter was born in France and died in Palestine. In about 1150, he married Elizabeth de Courtenay (1127 – September 1205), the daughter of Renaud de Courtenay and Hawise du Donjon, thus starting the Capetian line of the House of Courtenay.

Rumour has it that he is buried in a tomb in the floor of Exeter Cathedral, next to Elizabeth; however, no physical evidence currently exists and the historians at the cathedral can find no documentation to support this rumour.

Children
Peter I and his wife had ten children:
 Phillip (1153 – before 1186)
 Peter II, Latin Emperor of Constantinople (c. 1155 to 1218)
 Unnamed daughter (c. 1156 – ?)
 Alice (1160-12 Feb 1218), married Count Aymer of Angoulême
 Eustachia (1162–1235), married firstly William of Brienne, son of Erard II of Brienne and of Agnès of Montfaucon, secondly William of Champlitte
 Clémence (1164 – ?)
 Robert, Seigneur of Champignelles (1166–1239), married in 1217 Mathilde of Mehun (d. 1240). Their eldest son was Peter of Courtenay, Lord of Conches.
 William, Seigneur of Tanlay (1168 – before 1248)
 Isabella (1169 – after 1194)
 Constance (after 1170–1231)

Notes

References

Capetian House of Courtenay
1126 births
1183 deaths
Burials at Exeter Cathedral
Sons of kings